Petre Capusta (born 14 June 1957) is a Romanian sprint canoer who competed in the late 1970s and early 1980s. He won a silver medal in the C-2 500 m event at the 1980 Summer Olympics in Moscow.

External links
 

1957 births
Canoeists at the 1980 Summer Olympics
Living people
Olympic canoeists of Romania
Olympic silver medalists for Romania
Romanian male canoeists
Olympic medalists in canoeing
Medalists at the 1980 Summer Olympics